Thames Town is a new town in Songjiang District, about  from central Shanghai. It is named after the River Thames, which flows through London, United Kingdom. The architecture is themed according to British market town styles. There are cobbled streets, Victorian terraces, corner shops and red telephone boxes. High house prices led to few permanent residents moving to the area, causing many of the shops and restaurants to close and the area to become known as a "ghost town".

Description
Thames Town is a part of Songjiang New City, in Songjiang District. The G60 Shanghai–Kunming Expressway, formerly known as the Huhang Expressway, passes to its south.

While Songjiang District is an ancient prefecture which predates by far the establishment of Shanghai, Songjiang New City is a new development, intended to draw population away from central Shanghai. Within this city, one of the objectives for Thames Town was to provide accommodation for the staff of the new universities in adjacent Songjiang University Town. These developments were a part of the One City, Nine Towns initiative, which was passed by the Shanghai Planning Commission in 2001. This policy lasted for the duration of the tenth five year plan (2001–2005). The "one city" of this policy was Songjiang New City, where an English theme was used for Thames Town. The "nine towns" of the policy were each sited in one of the other suburban districts of Shanghai, and each was also given their own theme. Other Western themes used to date are Scandinavian (Luodian), Italian (Pujiang), Spanish (Fengcheng), Canadian (Fengjing), Dutch (Gaoqiao) and German (Anting).

The architectural firm of Atkins was given responsibility for planning Songjiang New City and designing Thames Town. The main developers for the town were Shanghai Songjiang New City Construction and Development, and Shanghai Henghe Real Estate. Thames Town was completed in 2006, occupying an area of 1 square kilometre and designed for a population of 10,000. Some of the architecture has been directly copied from buildings found in England, including the church (modelled on Christ Church, Clifton Down in Bristol),  a pub, and fish and chip shop (copied from buildings in Lyme Regis, Dorset), and Chester High Cross. It cost 5 billion yuan to construct.

The town consists mostly of low-density, single-family housing, with few commercial premises or community facilities. Although the houses sold rapidly, most purchases were by the relatively wealthy, as investments or second homes, and house prices rose to a high level. It was described as "a grotesque, and extremely funny parody of an olde English town seen through Chinese eyes, and built by canny British developers” by Jonathan Glancey.

The proportion of owners taking up permanent residence was low, and Business Insider described it as a "virtual ghost town". Nevertheless, in 2012 a similar English-style town was being planned near Beijing. By 2016, the majority of stores and restaurants in Thames Town were empty.

Despite its emptiness, the town has been used as a location for wedding photography, with the church and main square often used as a backdrop.

See also
 Jackson Hole, China
 Europe Street
 Ju Jun - known as "Orange County, China"
 Hallstatt (China)

References

Sources

External links 
 
 "Pubs, privet and parody as China builds little Britain by the Yangtse ", The Guardian, 16 August 2006
 "Shanghai surprise ... a new town in ye olde English style", The Guardian, 2 June 2004
 "Ye Olde Shanghai", Time, 14 February 2005
 Thames Town Documentary Photography series by Dave Wyatt, July 2008
 DowntownSongjiang Thames Town review Downtown Songjiang review & photos of Thames Town, October 2011

China–United Kingdom relations
Novelty architecture
Neighbourhoods of Shanghai
Replica constructions in China
Songjiang District